Dante is a station on line 1 of the Naples Metro. It was opened on 27 March 2002 as one-station extension from Museo. The station is located between Museo and Toledo. On 28 March 2011 the line was further extended to Università as non-stop shuttle service, as Toledo and Municipio stations were not yet ready.

The station is named after Piazza Dante, which, in turn, is named after Dante Alighieri.

References

Naples Metro stations
Railway stations opened in 2002
2002 establishments in Italy
Railway stations in Italy opened in the 21st century